Graphium simoni is a butterfly in the family Papilionidae (swallowtails). It is found in Nigeria, Cameroon, Gabon, the Republic of the Congo, the Democratic Republic of the Congo and the Central African Republic.

Description
In simoni Auriv. the median band is almost pure white, beneath on the hindwing sharply defined at both sides; the spot in the cell of the forewing is large, triangular and its apex often reaches the front margin of the cell, forming a transverse band much narrowed anteriorly. In the northern part of the Congo region.

Taxonomy
Graphium simoni belongs to a species group with 16 members. All are very similar
The species group members are:
Graphium abri Smith & Vane-Wright, 2001 
Graphium adamastor  (Boisduval, 1836) 
Graphium agamedes (Westwood, 1842)
Graphium almansor (Honrath, 1884)
Graphium auriger (Butler, 1876) 
Graphium aurivilliusi (Seeldrayers, 1896)
Graphium fulleri  (Grose-Smith, 1883)
Graphium hachei (Dewitz, 1881)
Graphium kigoma Carcasson, 1964
Graphium olbrechtsi Berger, 1950
Graphium poggianus (Honrath, 1884)
Graphium rileyi Berger, 1950
Graphium schubotzi (Schultze, 1913)
Graphium simoni (Aurivillius, 1899),
Graphium ucalegon  (Hewitson, 1865)[
Graphium ucalegonides (Staudinger, 1884)

References

External links
External images

simoni
Butterflies described in 1899
Butterflies of Africa
Taxa named by Per Olof Christopher Aurivillius